Frantic Assembly is a theatre production company. They have worked in over 40 countries and are widely studied as practitioners for A-Levels in the UK.

Background 

Frantic Assembly was formed by three students of Swansea University in 1994. None of the three studied drama, but were inspired by theatre and wanted to create their own unique company. They wanted to create non-realistic pieces through the use of much movement and music, although they have always said that this should never stray away from the storyline.

Their most notable production, in co-operation with The National Theatre, is The Curious Incident Of The Dog In The Night-Time, which won a Tony award for Best Play in 2015. In 2016, Frantic Assembly collaborated with State Theatre South Australia and Andrew Bovell to create Things I Know To Be True. This toured both Australia (2016) and the UK (2016 and 2017). 

In 2018, Frantic Assembly launched a podcast, which has had guest appearances from old school teachers of Scott Graham, Simon Stephens and Karl Hyde from Underworld.

References

Theatre production companies
British companies established in 1994